Jesús Javier Gómez Mercado (born 6 August 1984) is a Venezuelan footballer that currently plays for Estudiantes de Mérida as an attacking midfielder or also as a striker.

Club career
Product of Estudiantes de Mérida youth ranks, Gómez made his professional debut in 2004, breaking out the first team in the 2005–06 season, where played very well, that sealed his sale to Moroccan side Raja Casablanca. However, failing to repeat his performances, he joined Syrian club Al-Ittihad, where he had rematch. On 12 March 2008, the player made his AFC Champions League debut in a 2–0 win over Sepahan, where scored the first goal after a free kick.

In June 2008, Gómez returned to Venezuela and joined powerhouse club Caracas, where he won his first professional title (2008–09 Primera División) and was part of the Copa Libertadores' historic squad, because "Los Rojos de Ávila" were the first Venezuelan team to reach that tournament's quarterfinals. Also, Gómez was selected by FVF, clubs and players as Primera División most valuable player.

In early 2011, Jupiler League club Lierse signed Gómez for an undisclosed fee. However, he failed to play at Belgian club, so that joined on loan Wadi Degla of Egypt, where scored two goals in five EPL games. After a frustrating international spell, he returned to Caracas, for then join ACD Lara in mid-2012. After one season at Lara–based club, on 13 June 2013, he rescinded his contract, and joined Mexican club Delfines del Carmen.

International career
In August 2005, Gómez received a call-up to the Venezuela squad from coach Richard Paez, making his debut on 17 August in a 3–1 friendly match defeat against Ecuador, and scoring his first goal on 1 March 2006 during another friendly against Colombia in a 1–1 draw played in Maracaibo at Pachencho Romero.

International goals

Honours

Club
Caracas
 Primera División (2): 2008–09, 2009–10
 Copa Venezuela (1): 2009

Individual
 Venezuelan Primera División Most Valuable Player (1): 2009–10

References

External links
SportsYA profile

1984 births
Living people
Sportspeople from Maracay
Venezuelan footballers
Venezuelan expatriate footballers
Estudiantes de Mérida players
Raja CA players
Al-Ittihad Aleppo players
Caracas FC players
Lierse S.K. players
Wadi Degla SC players
Asociación Civil Deportivo Lara players
Dorados de Sinaloa footballers
Club Necaxa footballers
Atlante F.C. footballers
Atlético Venezuela C.F. players
Venezuelan Primera División players
Egyptian Premier League players
Ascenso MX players
Liga MX players
Expatriate footballers in Morocco
Expatriate footballers in Syria
Expatriate footballers in Egypt
Expatriate footballers in Belgium
Expatriate footballers in Mexico
Venezuelan expatriate sportspeople in Egypt
Venezuelan expatriate sportspeople in Morocco
Venezuelan expatriate sportspeople in Syria
Venezuelan expatriate sportspeople in Belgium
Venezuelan expatriate sportspeople in Mexico
Association football forwards
Syrian Premier League players
Venezuela international footballers